Jonkheer Pieter Godfried Maria van Meeuwen (11 March 1899 in 's-Hertogenbosch – 9 February 1982 in Ulestraten) was a Dutch judge and a politician.

Van Meeuwen studied law at Leiden University and obtained his degree in 1924. After working as a lawyer in 's-Hertogenbosch until 1927 he was a court clerk at the local arrondissement court until 1930. Van Meeuwen subsequently judge at the same court, which he remained until 1936. He then took up a similar position at The Hague court, which he kept until 1949. He then acquired a seat in the court of justice (Dutch:Gerechtshof) in the same city. He stayed on until 1951, and then took up a similar position at the court of justice of 's-Hertogenbosch. In 1955 he transferred to the canton court of Heerlen, where he served until April 1969.

After World War II Van Meeuwen was Vice-President of the Bijzonder Gerechtshof of The Hague until 1 December 1946, and continued as President until 1 February 1949. During this period he sentenced Hanns Albin Rauter to death.

Van Meeuwen was active in politics as well. He was a member of the Roman Catholic State Party and its successor party the Catholic People's Party. He was a member of the States of North Brabant (15 April 1931–January 1936) and the States of Limburg (6 July 1954 – 1 December 1956). Van Meeuwen was a member of the Senate of the Netherlands from 6 November 1956 to 16 September 1969.

Private life 
Van Meeuwen married Louisa Augusta Johanna Maria van Lanschot; they had five children.

Distinction 
 Knight of the Order of the Netherlands Lion (1964)

References

1899 births
1982 deaths
Catholic People's Party politicians
20th-century Dutch politicians
20th-century Dutch judges
Knights of the Order of the Netherlands Lion
Leiden University alumni
Members of the Provincial Council of Limburg
Members of the Provincial Council of North Brabant
Members of the Senate (Netherlands)
People from 's-Hertogenbosch
Roman Catholic State Party politicians